Arborfield and Newland is a civil parish in the Wokingham district of Berkshire, England.  It had a population of 2,228 according to the 2001 census, increasing to 3,115 at the 2011 Census.  It includes Arborfield, Arborfield Cross, part of Arborfield Garrison, Newland and Carter's Hill.

References

Borough of Wokingham
Civil parishes in Berkshire